The Bridge at Remagen is a 1969 DeLuxe Color war film in Panavision starring George Segal, Ben Gazzara and Robert Vaughn. The film, which was directed by John Guillermin, was shot in Czechoslovakia. It is based on the nonfiction book The Bridge at Remagen: The Amazing Story of March 7, 1945 by writer and U.S. Representative Ken Hechler. The screenplay was adapted by Richard Yates and William Roberts.

The film is a highly fictionalized version of actual events during the last months of World War II when the U.S. 9th Armored Division approached Remagen and captured the intact Ludendorff Bridge. While the real battle ran for a week and involved several artillery duels between the U.S. troops and German defenders, the film focuses more specifically on the heroism and human cost in gaining the bridgehead across the Rhine before the Allies' final advance into Germany. The Remagen bridge was never rebuilt; the towers on each bank were converted into a museum and arts studios.

Plot
The film opens with the United States Army failing to capture the still-intact Oberkassel railway bridge. Lieutenant Hartman (George Segal) is an experienced combat team leader who is becoming weary of the war in Europe. After he is promoted to company commander following the reckless death of the previous officer, Hartman is ordered to advance to the Rhine River at Remagen, where he is promised a rest for his men. At the same time, Major Paul Kreuger (Robert Vaughn) of the German Army is assigned to destroy the Remagen bridge by his friend and superior, Colonel General von Brock (Peter van Eyck), who has been given a written order to do it immediately. The general appeals to Kreuger's sense of honor, giving him a verbal command to defend the bridge for as long as possible, to allow the German 15th Army, trapped on the west bank of the river, to escape.

After capturing the undefended town of Meckenheim, 12 miles (20 km) from Remagen, Hartman is ordered by his battalion commander, Major Barnes (Bradford Dillman), to continue the advance until encountering resistance. Kreuger tours the defenses above the town of Remagen and assures the local contingent of defending German troops, many of whom are older men and boys, that the tank reserves personally guaranteed by the general are on the way. When Hartman's troops attack the town, Kreuger discovers that von Brock made an empty promise to him; he calls the general's headquarters for the promised tanks and is told they have been sent "elsewhere". On finding the bridge intact, General Shinner (E. G. Marshall) orders Major Barnes to secure its capture, saying: "It's a crap shoot, Major. We're risking 100 men, but you may save 10,000." Barnes agrees to commit Hartman's company and orders them to assault the German defenses on the bridge to gain a foothold across the Rhine. By doing so, the U.S. Army would avoid a more costly river crossing elsewhere. Sergeant Angelo (Ben Gazzara), one of Hartman's squad leaders, strikes Barnes after the major threatens Hartman.

As the U.S. soldiers rush the bridge, Kreuger, along with explosives engineer Captain Baumann (Joachim Hansen) and Captain Schmidt (Hans Christian Blech) from the Remagen Bridge Security Command, try to blow up the bridge, but the explosives they use prove to be not the high-yield military grade charges needed for the job, but weaker, industrial explosives, which fail to destroy the structure. Hartman's troops dig in to consolidate their position on the bridge.

Kreuger shoots two soldiers as they try to desert. Realizing the futility of the situation, Kreuger returns to headquarters to make a personal appeal to the general for more reinforcements, but on arrival finds the HQ building seized by the SS. Von Brock has been arrested by the S.S. for "defeatism." Kreuger is questioned by them about the delay in destroying the bridge and is also arrested.

At Remagen, Hartman leads a raid against a machine-gun nest installed by Kreuger on board a barge moored to the bridge, but while killing its crew, Angelo is hit and falls into the river. Hartman marches on foot towards the bridge defenders' post at the same time as a squadron of M24 Chaffee light tanks crosses the bridge. The remaining German soldiers surrender to the U.S. troops. In the aftermath of the battle, Hartman discovers Angelo alive. The next day, Kreuger is led out for execution by an SS firing squad. With the sound of airplanes overhead, Kreuger asks: "Ours or theirs?". The attending SS officer replies, "Enemy planes, sir!" "But who is the enemy?" muses Kreuger before he is shot.

A screen message (or chyron) informs the viewer that the actual bridge collapsed into the Rhine 10 days after its capture.

Cast
 George Segal as Lieutenant Phil Hartman, based on Lieutenant Karl Timmermann
 Robert Vaughn as Major Paul Kreuger, based on Major Hans Scheller
 Ben Gazzara as Sergeant Angelo, composite of Sergeants Alexander Drabik and Joseph DeLisio
 Bradford Dillman as Major Barnes, based loosely on Major Murray L. Deevers
 E. G. Marshall as General Shinner, based on Brigadier General William Hoge
 Peter Van Eyck as Generaloberst Von Brock, based loosely on Generalleutnant Walter Botsch
 Hans Christian Blech as Hauptmann Karl Schmidt, based on Hauptmann Willi Bratge
 Heinz Reincke as Councillor Holzgang, the Mayor in charge of civil defence 
 Joachim Hansen as Hauptmann Otto Baumann, engineering officer, based on Hauptmann Carl Friesenhahn
 Sonja Ziemann as Greta Holzgang
 Anna Gael as French Girl
 Bo Hopkins as Corporal Grebs
 Robert Logan as Private Bissell
 Matt Clark as Corporal Jellicoe
 Steve Sandor as Private Slavek
 Frank Webb as Private Glover
 Tom Heaton as Lieutenant Pattison, based on Lieutenant Emmett James "Jim" Burrows
 Paul Prokop as Captain John Colt
 Richard Münch as General Von Sturmer
 Günter Meisner as SS-Obergruppenführer Gerlach

Original book
The film was based on a book by Ken Hechler, a war historian who was serving in the U.S. Army in 1945. "I was lucky to be about 10 miles from Remagen when the electrifying news came down that the bridge had been captured," said Hechler later. "We had just liberated this wine cellar. The first units came back and were sent into reserve, and had nothing to do but drink wine and talk about what they had done."

The resulting interviews, plus postwar interviews with German soldiers who were at the bridge, formed the bulk of the research for Hechler's book, which was published in 1957. The book ended up selling over 500,000 copies.

Hechler used money from the book to finance his successful campaign to represent West Virginia's 4th congressional district in the United States House of Representatives in the 1958 elections.

Production

Development
In May 1958, film rights were purchased by Schulberg Productions, owned by Budd Schulberg, who had witnessed the crossing and intended to film it as The Day We Crossed the Rhine. It was meant to follow Schulberg's film Wind Across the Everglades. Schulberg said Stanley Kubrick was interested in directing and the film would be made in West Germany. Columbia agreed to finance.

In November 1960, Schulberg said the film would start shooting in May 1961 with financing from The Mirisch Company and United Artists, but the film was not made by Schulberg.

In 1965, the rights were bought by David Wolper. It was to be the first in a six-picture deal he signed with United Artists. Irvin Kershner was to direct.

Roger O. Hirson was signed to write the script. A few months later, Richard Yates was reportedly working on the script. Later on William Roberts, Rod Serling, and Theodore Strauss worked on it. These delays meant Wolper ended up making another war film first, The Devil's Brigade.

Hechler says he was only offered $5,000 for the use of the book. "They told me if I held out for more money, they'd change the name from The Bridge at Remagen to The Remagen Bridge and base it on newspaper accounts, which were public domain and covered the event widely at the time."

Casting
By April 1968, George Segal had signed to star and John Guillermin was to direct. Ben Gazzara then agreed to sign – his first feature in three years. Robert Vaughn joined soon after.  "I decided to get young actors," said Wolper. "You can't get Kirk Douglas and Burt Lancaster – who are older than General Eisenhower." Robert Blake was cast in a role but departed in order to spend more time with his family, while Alex Cord declined to be in the film.

Filming
West German officials would not allow the film to be made in Germany because of shipping traffic on the Rhine. The trend was increasing at the time to shoot Hollywood films in Eastern Europe to save money – The Fixer was filmed in Hungary and Castle Keep in Yugoslavia. Correspondingly, after six months of location scouting The Bridge at Remagen became the first American film to be shot in Communist Czechoslovakia. According to a British press report,  £833,000 of the £2,100,000 budget were saved by shooting in Czechoslovakia.

Czechoslovakia

Wolper paid $750,000 and Czech distribution rights to Barrandov Studios in exchange for their facilities and local labor. The U.S. World War II equipment was borrowed from the government of Austria, which had originally obtained it from the Americans. The Czechoslovak government provided German uniforms and weapons that had been captured during the war. Czechoslovak People's Army soldiers served as extras in the film, and were even trained to use U.S. military equipment.

Filming started on June 6, 1968 and was meant to be completed by October, but shooting was difficult from the start. The production manager fell ill, and the first assistant director quit. Also, clashes in work methods occurred within the crew, of whom roughly 60 were from the West and 200 were Czech. However, after an awkward start, the Westerners and Czechs eventually forged a decent working relationship.

It was a period of political instability in Czechoslovakia due to the Prague Spring. The film crew was accused by the Soviet and East German presses of smuggling weapons into the country and serving as a cover for the CIA. The Czechs, however, did not take this charge too seriously, and Czech members of the crew jokingly referring to Wolper as "Mr. CIA." After the East German newspaper Neues Deutschland alleged that the production was a front for preparations of a U.S. Armed Forces occupation of the country, some Czechoslovak police and military officials did inspect the arsenal of arms at Barrandov studios and found everything in order.

Many of the Remagen town scenes were shot in the town of Most. The old town was being demolished and rebuilt at a new location at the time so that the lignite deposits under its soil would become accessible for mining.

The Remagen Bridge scenes were shot at Davle on the Vltava River using the old bridge, which the Czechoslovak Ministry of Transportation closed for the summer. This was controversial because many residents of Prague used the bridge to access vacation homes in Davle. Fake towers and a fake railway tunnel were constructed for the film. The film's opening scenes, where the U.S. Army fails to capture the Oberkassel, Bonn bridge, were shot just south of the village of Vrané nad Vltavou using the railway bridge, which carries the Prague-Dobříš line over the River Vltava.

During filming, Guillermin told producer Wolper that he did not want the distraction of Wolper being on set, and tried to ban the producer from it. Wolper responded by telling Guillermin that if he could not direct with Wolper on set, then he would be fired. Guillermin promptly apologised. Wolper later called Guillermin "a real pain in the ass".

Soviet invasion
On 20 August 1968, when the film was two-thirds complete, the Soviet Army invaded Czechoslovakia to reinstall a hardline Communist government. Filming had to be halted and the bulk of the cast and crew were stuck in the International Hotel in Prague under advice from the U.S. Embassy. Wolper had flown out from Prague to Rome the night of the invasion to supervise filming of his other film If It's Tuesday, This Must Be Belgium and then quickly flew to Vienna to negotiate with the new government for permission for the film's crew to be released.

The cast and crew voted on whether to stay or leave. Only three voted to stay — Guillermin and two stuntmen. Some cast and crew, including future U.S. Ambassador to Czechoslovakia Shirley Temple Black, left in a 400-car convoy that took them to Pilsen and then to Nuremberg. A few hours later, 79 cast and crew escaped in a 20-car caravan driven by Czechs. They travelled to Gmünd in Austria, one hour before the border was closed, after which they travelled to Vienna.

Items left behind included many personal possessions, the last five days' worth of filming, and $1 million worth of equipment, including eight tanks and four cameras of unprocessed film. "It was just like an adventure movie," said Bradford Dillman, "except the tragedy was real." Some had to flee to Vienna in a 60-car convoy.

Wolper said "circumstances have conspired to turn an innocent and expensive enterprise into a political football." The issues caused the budget to increase from $3.5 million to $5 million.

Germany
Filming resumed in Hamburg, West Germany, where ideal studio facilities were available, in October 1968. Unfinished scenes involving the bridge were shot at Castel Gandolfo in Italy. Wolper also negotiated filming of the blowing up of the bridge in Prague.

Wolper later wrote, "the actors get on the bridge in Czechoslovakia, remove explosive under the bridge in Germany and get off the bridge in Italy." "If we bring some unity to this picture it will be a miracle," said Vaughan.

Wolper says the film had insurance to cover an invasion, but that the insurance company argued that it was not an invasion, rather the government invited the Russians in. The matter settled and Wolper got some compensation, but not the full amount. Contrary to Wolper's expectations, the Soviet occupation force allowed the U.S. military equipment lent by the Austrian government to be returned. The film finished after 93 days.

Accuracy
According to Hechler, "although Hollywood has its own ideas of the truth, probably 95% of it is accurate. It was doubly exciting to see the good actors they got to portray it." Hechler says the opening scene of the tanks going fast was not true. "They said it was more exciting that way. Also, there were several scenes with women, which I never saw in 1945. There's a little bit of a love interest there." Hechler also says the names of the participants were changed, "I imagine to avoid lawsuits", and he was "very happy with" the film, "because it brought attention to one of the great examples of the initiative and training of the American soldiers. They took advantage of an opportunity that had not been planned at all. It's also a tribute to the leadership of [Lt.] Karl Timmermann, who was the first officer who crossed."

Release
The Bridge at Remagen was released in theatres on June 25, 1969. The ABC network broadcast the film on television in the U.S. on July 24, 1977. The film was released on DVD by MGM Home Entertainment on January 24, 2006 and January 31, 2006.

Wolper says, "perhaps it was not the best idea to distribute a film about war and heroism at the height of the war in Vietnam. The film received mixed reviews. It was accused of being too realistic and not realistic enough ... Given the circumstances, I think it is a fine picture and it plays quite often on television."

Filmink said "it's tough and fast and looks great."

2007 radio play
In 2007, Vaughn played himself in a BBC Radio 4 dramatisation of the events surrounding the invasion.

See also

 List of American films of 1969
 A Bridge Too Far (1977 film) — another World War II battle involving a bridge that occurred about six months earlier in the Netherlands

References

Further reading

External links
 
 
 
 
 
 Illustrated article on the Bridge at Remagen at 'Battlefields Europe'
 Filming locations with real photos at Movieloci.com

1969 films
1969 war films
American war films
1960s English-language films
Films scored by Elmer Bernstein
Films based on non-fiction books
Films directed by John Guillermin
Films set in 1945
Films set in Germany
Films shot in the Czech Republic
United Artists films
Western Front of World War II films
The Wolper Organization films
Films about bridges
Films shot at Barrandov Studios
Films shot in Prague
Films shot in Munich
Films shot in Lazio
American World War II films
Films set in North Rhine-Westphalia
Films with screenplays by William Roberts (screenwriter)
Films about the United States Army
World War II films based on actual events
Films produced by David L. Wolper
1960s American films